The Lammer is a river of Salzburg, Austria, a right tributary of the Salzach.

The Lammer rises in the Tennen Mountains and flows from east to west, joining with the Salzach at Golling an der Salzach. The river is known for its very clean water and is very popular for wild water sportsmen.

Rivers of Salzburg (state)
Rivers of Austria